Median nail dystrophy (also known as "Dystrophia unguis mediana canaliformis," "Median canaliform dystrophy of Heller," and "Solenonychia") consists of longitudinal splitting or canal formation in the midline of the nail, a split which often resembles a fir tree, occurring at the cuticle and proceeding outward as the nail grows.

Thumbs, which are the most commonly involved, usually show an enlarged lunula resulting probably from repeated pressure applied on the base of the nail.

See also
Nail (anatomy)
Habit-tic deformity

References

Conditions of the skin appendages